Steven Myers is the founder and former CEO of the large aerospace and defense management consulting firm, Steven Myers & Associates (SM&A). He is also a four-time CEO, serial entrepreneur, international bestselling author, and keynote business speaker who is very active in public service efforts. Steven lectures frequently about being an entrepreneur at USC Marshall School of Business where he speaks about topics such as business competition.

Steven Myers currently serves in multiple board leadership roles and was on the U.S. Department of State Advisory Committee on International Economic policy, which advised then Secretary of State John Kerry. Steve also served as the Chairman of the National Security Membership Committee and was on the board of directors for the Pacific Council on International Policy. Steven is the former Chairman of the Orange County Homeland Security Advisory Council and currently serves on the board of the publicly listed company Caladrius.

An Airline Transport Pilot, Steven has more than 6,200 hours of flight time and twelve jet type ratings. Between 1994 and 2007, his jet management business operated charter flights worldwide.  Steve's private equity investment company, Dolphin Capital Holdings, invests in companies with business strategies such as applied materials development, stem-cell therapeutics and distressed debt portfolio management. Steve's article on stem-cell research and the Catholic Church appeared in Forbes on January 23, 2012.

Steven Myer's Company SM&A

In 1982, Steve founded the Aerospace & Defense management consulting firm Steven Myers & Associates, (SM&A). He served as the CEO and chairman for the competition management service provider until 2007. During this time, Steven led innovations for U.S. Government programs and changed the industry, with more than $360 billion in major program competitions.  Over the last thirty years, SM&A has generated some $1.2 billion in revenue and employed over two thousand people. SM&A was sold to Odyssey Investment partners in 2008.

First American to Fly into the Russian Kamchatka Peninsula

In 1992, Steven Myers became the first American pilot to fly into the Kamchatka Peninsula, located in Far Eastern Russia. Steve's role helped to create a union between the United States and the governor of Kamchatka in one of the first successful Russian-American ventures. His involvement helped create a refueling base for carriers with international cargo near the city of Petropavlovsk and introduced entrepreneurship into post-Soviet Russia.

As a result of Steven's international efforts, he was invited to give expert testimony before the U.S. Committee on Government Operations about how to best conduct international business in Russia. Steven Myers book, Crosswinds: Adventure and Entrepreneurship in the Russian Far East is an international best seller and available on Amazon or through Steve's website:  www.stevenmyers.com

International Bestselling Book Cross Winds:  Adventure and Entrepreneurship in the Russian Far East 
In 2020, Steve published a hardcover book about his entrepreneurial enterprise and aviation adventure into a remote part of Russia just after the Cold War, where he started up a joint Russian-American business venture. The book has reached international bestselling status on Amazon and has received critical acclaim among reviewers. An audiobook version was released in 2021, and a paperback version is forthcoming. HIs book is available on Amazon or through StevenMyers.com.

Philanthropy

Steven Myers and his wife are very active in philanthropy, giving back to their local community as well as supporting educational scholarships and international aid. Organizations they support include Stanford University Founding Grant Society, United Way Million Dollar Round Table and the International Medical Corp.

See also
SM&A

External links
http://www.smawins.com
http://www.stevenmyers.com
http://www.state.gov/e/eeb/adcom/aciep/index.htm
http://www.pacificcouncil.org/page.aspx?pid=326
https://web.archive.org/web/20120207190417/http://www.ochsac.org/annoucements

American aerospace businesspeople
Living people
Year of birth missing (living people)